Nordre Randberget is a mountain in Sørkapp Land at Spitsbergen, Svalbard. It has a height of 305 m.a.s.l., and is located south of Vasil'evbreen and Isbukta.

References

Mountains of Spitsbergen